His Majesty's Naval Base, Clyde (HMNB Clyde; also HMS Neptune), primarily sited at Faslane on the Gare Loch, is one of three operating bases in the United Kingdom for the Royal Navy (the others being HMNB Devonport and HMNB Portsmouth). It is the navy's headquarters in Scotland and is best known as the home of Britain's nuclear weapons, in the form of nuclear submarines armed with Trident missiles.

History
Faslane was first constructed and used as a base in the Second World War. During the 1960s, the British Government began negotiating the Polaris Sales Agreement with the United States regarding the purchase of a Polaris missile system to fire British-built nuclear weapons from five specially constructed submarines. These four submarines were permanently based at Faslane.

Faslane itself was chosen to host these vessels at the height of the Cold War because of its geographic position, which forms a bastion on the relatively secluded but deep and easily navigable Gare Loch and Firth of Clyde on the west coast of Scotland. This position provides for rapid and stealthy access through the North Channel to the submarine patrolling areas in the North Atlantic, through the GIUK gap to the Norwegian Sea. At the time it was chosen, the location was also close to the American SSBN base at Holy Loch, which operated 1961–1992. One boat was always on patrol at any given time.

In 1971 the base was home to the 3rd Submarine Squadron of Nuclear Fleet and Diesel Patrol Submarines, "the fighters", and the 10th Submarine Squadron consisting of the four Polaris submarines, "the bombers".

In Command

Based vessels and units 
The following notable vessels and units are based at Faslane.

Royal Navy 
Commodore J. L. Perks OBE, Commander Submarine Flotilla/(Commodore Submarine Service (COSM))
 Vanguard-class SSBNs
 
 

 Astute-class SSNs
 HMS Astute
 HMS Ambush
HMS Artful
HMS Audacious
 HMS Anson
 Sandown-class mine countermeasures vessels
HMS Penzance 
HMS Pembroke
HMS Bangor - forward deployed with 9 Mine Countermeasures Squadron in Bahrain
 Faslane Patrol Boat Squadron
  (Archer-class patrol vessel)
   (Archer-class patrol vessel)
 Northern Diving Group
 x1 Vahana-class 15m diving support boat

Royal Marines (3 Commando Brigade)
 43 Commando Fleet Protection Group
 Headquarters Squadron
 O Rifle Squadron
 P Rifle Squadron
 R Rifle Squadron
 Island-class patrol vessels
 Mull
 Rona
 Eorsa

Serco Marine Services 
 Multicat 2613-class utility boat
 SD Angeline 
 Coastal oilers
 SD Oilman
 SD Waterpress
 Impulse-class tugs
 SD Impulse (A344)
 SD Impetus (A345)
 ATD 2909-class tugs
 SD Reliable
 SD Resourceful
 SD Dependable
 STAN 2608-class tugs
 SD Jupiter
 Oban-class tenders
 SD Oronsay
 SD Omagh
 Personnel ferries
 SD Eva
 STAN 1505-class tenders
 SD Clyde Racer
 STAN 1905-class tenders
 SD Clyde Spirit

Ministry of Defence Police 
 Clyde Marine Unit  
 Island-class patrol vessels
 Iona
 Skye
 Lismore
 Barra
 Harris
 Jura
 Nuclear Division (Faslane Station)
 Central Support Group

Role and operations
The submarine base encompasses a number of separate sites, the primary two being:
Faslane, 25 miles from Glasgow;

Faslane is also a Defence Equipment and Support site, operated in dual site organisation with Great Harbour, Greenock, by Babcock Marine and Technology, and managed by Serco Denholm.

The naval shore establishment at Faslane is HMS Neptune, Naval personnel appointed to the base who do not belong to a seagoing vessel make up Ship's Company.  Both the Gare Loch and Loch Long are sea lochs extending northwards from the Firth of Clyde. The base serves as home base to Britain's fleet of  nuclear-powered and nuclear-armed submarines, as well as conventionally armed nuclear-powered submarines, supported by the 43 Commando Fleet Protection Group Royal Marines.

In command of HMNB Clyde is the Naval Base Commander (Clyde), Commodore Donald Doull, who succeeded Commodore Mark Gayfer in Summer 2018. The base is home to a number of lodger units including Flag Officer Scotland and Northern Ireland (FOSNI) (who is also Rear Admiral Submarines), the Northern Diving Group and the Scottish Headquarters of the Ministry of Defence Police. It is base to 3,000 service personnel, 800 of their families and 4,000 civilian workers, largely from Babcock Marine, forming a major part of the economy of Argyll and Bute and West Dunbartonshire.

By 2020 all 11 Royal Navy submarines will be based on the Clyde at Faslane, seeing the number of people directly employed at the base rising to 8,200. In 2018, the Secretary of State for Scotland at the time, David Mundell said: "The UK’s entire submarine fleet will be based at Faslane by 2020. This will reinforce Scotland’s vital role in protecting our country, and guarantee skilled, secure jobs on the Clyde for years to come."

Safety and accidents at Faslane
Exercise Evening Star is the annual test of the emergency response routines to a nuclear weapon accident at Faslane. It is conducted by the Office for Nuclear Regulation. In 2011 the test failed as "a number of command and control aspects of the exercise were not considered to have been adequately demonstrated".

In 2013–14 there were 99 radiation accidents concerning nuclear reactors, and 6 with nuclear weapons. These are the highest numbers for at least six years. The MoD maintains that there was no risk to the public as most of them were minor accidents. The SNP defence spokesman, Angus Robertson, called the figures "totally shocking".

The MoD, however, argued that it was "entirely misleading" to focus only on the number of incidents, because they include "very minor issues such as the failure to fill out the correct form before painting works began." Indeed, the MOD stated that this "rigorous system shows how seriously MoD takes all aspects of nuclear safety, ensuring lessons are learned, and we can be clear that none of the events in the reports posed any risk to the health of our personnel, or to any members of the public." Indeed, one of the recorded events was the incorrect labelling of an empty pallet. Minor events were reported and investigated so that performance could be continuously improved. "This comprehensive, independent recording process allows Clyde to maintain a robust reporting culture, undertake learning from experience and to take early corrective action," the UK Defence Minister, Philip Dunne, told MPs.

Anti-nuclear demonstrations

Given the presence of these nuclear capable missiles, Faslane has attracted demonstrations by Campaign for Nuclear Disarmament and other Scottish pressure groups, including Trident Ploughshares. Since 1982, a permanent peace camp is outside the base gates, where there are frequent demonstrations and regular Wednesday protests. The presence of Faslane is also an issue in Scottish politics.

The Scottish National Party (SNP), the Scottish Socialist Party (SSP), and the Scottish Greens all oppose the deployment of nuclear weapons although the SNP have made assurances that they would retain the base for the servicing of conventionally armed and conventionally powered naval units. Members of those parties and indeed some from the Labour Party are often present at rallies. Also, some former independents, such as George Galloway attend rallies outside Faslane.

Faslane 365
The Faslane 365 campaign was a one-year protest at the base. It was a civil resistance initiative to apply critical public pressure for the disarmament of Britain's nuclear weapons.

The campaign was launched in September 2006, with the first protest action commencing on 1 October 2006 carried out by a campaigning group of women associated with protests at Greenham Common. It formally ended with a "Big Blockade" on 1 October 2007.

131 blockading groups took part in Faslane 365 and 1150 arrests were made.

References

External links 

 
 King's Bay Trident Refit Facility

Buildings and structures in Argyll and Bute
Scottish coast
Politics of Scotland
Royal Navy bases in Scotland
Ports and harbours of Scotland
United Kingdom nuclear command and control
Royal Navy submarine bases
Trident (UK nuclear programme)
1964 establishments in Scotland
Polaris (UK nuclear programme)
Firth of Clyde